The Masque of Life is a 1916 thrill picture, made during World War 1, centering around circus life and a kingdom. It was directed by Alfred Lind with an international cast with familiar names Hamilton Revelle and Rita Jolivet starring in the film.

Cast
Hamilton Revelle - Pierrot
Emmo Semmori - Giovanni Randolfi
Rita Jolivet - Perrette
Käthe Morrison - Anne Randolfi
Carmen Tarello - Marie Randolfi - beider Tochter
Mia Romeli - Grafin Tamari
Luigi Cassolini - Guido - ihr sohn
Caine Cavallo - Charly Dauphin - ihr Neffe
Fredo Baxter - Ernesto Morgan - Zirkusdirector
John Thompson - Border - ein Neger
Robert Florey - John Chatle - der Detektiv
Trude Nick - Dienstmädchen
Francisque Caill - Polizist
Deligny - Polizist
Jacques Faure -

Miss Evelyn - Evelyn
Pete Montebello - a chimpanzee actor

References

External links
 The Masque of Life at IMDb.com
AMG
 film herald(ha,Heritage Auctions)

1916 films
Italian silent films
Films directed by Alfred Lind